Chapagetti is a brand of ramyeon produced by Nongshim. It was first released in South Korea on March 19, 1984. Chapagetti is the first instant noodle product to resemble jajangmyeon in South Korea and is the second highest-selling brand of instant noodles in South Korea, behind Shin Ramyun. Its name is a portmanteau of jajangmyeon (which is also romanized as chajangmyŏn) and spaghetti. In 2012, sales of Chapagetti reached 159.5 billion won with 88% of market share. 

Shrimp Chapaghetti was launched in 1986, but it was discontinued due to sluggish sales. On September 6, 2004, Sacheon (Korean: 사천; Hanja: 泗川) cuisine Chapaghetti was launched.

In popular culture 
In the Academy Award-winning South Korean film Parasite, a dish called Chapaguri (짜파구리) is cooked by one of the characters, which is a mix of Chapagetti and Neoguri. The English version of the film calls this "ram-don", an expression created by the translator, and the footage shows packages labelled in English "ramyeon" and "udon" to highlight to English speakers how the name was created. Nongshim, which manufactures both brands of noodle, published an "official" recipe for Chapaguri on their YouTube channel.

See also
 List of noodles
 List of instant noodle brands

References

External links

 

South Korean brands
Instant noodle brands